Menesia calliope is a species of beetle in the family Cerambycidae. It was described by James Thomson in 1879. It is known from Malaysia.

References

Menesia
Beetles described in 1879